Benny Waters was an American football coach.  He served as the third head football coach at the North Carolina College for Negroes—now known as North Carolina Central University–in Durham, North Carolina and he held that position for two seasons, from 1927 until 1928.  His coaching record at North Carolina Central was 7–8–2.

References

Year of birth missing
Year of death missing
North Carolina Central Eagles football coaches